

This is a list of the National Register of Historic Places listings in Jefferson Davis Parish, Louisiana.

This is intended to be a complete list of the properties on the National Register of Historic Places in Jefferson Davis Parish, Louisiana, United States.  The locations of National Register properties for which the latitude and longitude coordinates are included below, may be seen in a map.

There are 17 properties listed on the National Register in the parish, and one former listing.

Current listings

|}

Former listings

|}

See also

List of National Historic Landmarks in Louisiana
National Register of Historic Places listings in Louisiana

References

Jefferson Davis Parish